Masticatory muscle myositis (MMM) is an inflammatory disease in dogs affecting the muscles of mastication (chewing).  It is also known as atrophic myositis or eosinophilic myositis.  MMM is the most common inflammatory myopathy in dogs.  The disease mainly affects large breed dogs.  German Shepherd Dogs  and Cavalier King Charles Spaniels may be predisposed.  There is a similar disease of the eye muscles found in Golden Retrievers.  Symptoms of acute MMM include swelling of the jaw muscles, drooling, and pain on opening the mouth.  Ophthalmic signs may include third eyelid protrusion, red eyes, and exophthalmos (protruding eyeballs).  In chronic MMM there is atrophy of the jaw muscles, and scarring of the masticatory muscles due to fibrosis may result in inability to open the mouth (trismus).  The affected muscles include the temporalis, masseter, and pterygoid muscles.  The disease is usually bilateral.

MMM is caused by the presence of 2M fibers in the muscles of the jaw.  2M fibers are not found elsewhere in the body.  The immune system recognizes these proteins as foreign to the body and attacks them, resulting in inflammation.  Diagnosis of MMM is through either biopsy of the temporalis or masseter muscles or the 2M antibody assay, in which blood serum of the possible MMM-dog is reacted with temporalis tissue of a normal dog, or both. False negatives by the 2M antibody assay may be obtained if MMM is end-stage with destruction of type 2M fibers and marked fibrosis. Treatment is usually with corticosteroids such as prednisone, often with decreasing doses for up to 4–6 months, and in the case of trismus, manual opening of the mouth under anesthesia.  Feeding very soft or liquid food during this time is usually necessary. The ultimate degree of recovery of jaw function and muscle mass will depend upon the extent of damage to the muscle tissue. Recurrence of MMM may occur.  Misdiagnosis of MMM as a retroorbital abscess based on physical examination and finding of trismus leads to inappropriate treatment with antibiotics, which will not impede the progress of MMM.

References

External links
Most Commonly Asked Questions about Masticatory Muscle Myositis
Masticatory muscle myositis (MMM), Dogs
Masticatory Muscle Myositis in the Cavalier King Charles Spaniel

Dog diseases